Asterocyphella is a genus of fungi in the Cyphellaceae family. The widespread genus contains three species.

References

Cyphellaceae
Agaricales genera